Klaus Kröll (born 24 April 1980) is a former World Cup alpine ski racer from Austria. He specialized in the speed events of downhill and super-G and won the World Cup downhill season title in 2012.  He competed in three Winter Olympics and three World Championships.

Born in Öblarn, Styria, Kröll made his World Cup debut in January 2000 at age 19. His first World Cup victory was the super-G in Kitzbühel in 2009. He ended his career having achieved six World Cup victories and 24 podia, with three wins and eight podiums at Kvitfjell, Norway.

Kröll won the World Cup downhill title in 2012 with three victories and three additional podiums. He finished seventh at the World Cup finals to hold off Beat Feuz in the final standings by just seven points, 605–598.

World Cup results

Season titles

Season standings

Race podiums
 6 wins – (4 DH, 2 SG)
 24 podiums – (21 DH, 3 SG)

World Championship results

Olympic results

References

External links
 
 Klaus Kröll World Cup standings at the International Ski Federation
 
 
  
 Austrian Ski team (ÖSV) – official site – Klaus Kröll – 
 Salomon Racing.com – team – alpine skiing – Klaus Kröll

1980 births
Austrian male alpine skiers
Alpine skiers at the 2006 Winter Olympics
Alpine skiers at the 2010 Winter Olympics
Alpine skiers at the 2014 Winter Olympics
Olympic alpine skiers of Austria
FIS Alpine Ski World Cup champions
People from Liezen District
Living people
Sportspeople from Styria
20th-century Austrian people
21st-century Austrian people